"Waiting for Duffman" is the seventeenth episode of the twenty-sixth season of the American animated television series The Simpsons, and the 569th overall episode of the series. It originally aired on the Fox network in the United States on March 15, 2015. R. Lee Ermey reprises his role of Colonel Leslie Hapablap from "Sideshow Bob's Last Gleaming". The title is a play on Waiting for Guffman.

"Waiting for Duffman" was dedicated in memory of Sam Simon, a developer of The Simpsons, who died seven days before it aired.

Plot
When Barry Huffman (the man who plays Duffman) undergoes hip replacement surgery following an injury during a parade and retires, Duff Beer's owner Howard K. Duff VII sets up a reality show called "So You Think You Can Duff," presented by Cat Deeley in order to find his replacement. The judges for this competition are Der Zip Zorp (a best-selling Electronica artist that wears a computer monitor-shaped helmet), Missy LeBeau (a former Duff Girl and current senator from Oklahoma), and Rajneesh Superstar (a billionaire Mumbai entrepreneur). The competition is fierce until only Homer Simpson and one other competitor remained. Homer wins the competition after the other contestant was disqualified upon Der Zip Zorp detecting a tattoo of Duff Beer's competitor Olde Ogdenville Ale on his back. Howard K. Duff VII tells him that he has inserted him with a chip that will reveal if he drinks, because he must stay sober on the job.

While sober, Homer sees the misery that Duff is causing to the people and environment of Springfield. At a motor racing event, he gives out alcohol-free beer as a placebo in an attempt to convince the audience that alcohol is not essential for a good time. This angers them, and they form an angry mob. Howard K. Duff fires Homer and tells him that there was no chip, resulting in Homer's return to heavy drinking.

Following the incident, Howard K. Duff tracks down Barry Huffman (who is now working at a coffee shop) and convinces him to take his old job back.

Cultural references

 The title references Waiting for Guffman which itself references Waiting for Godot.

 When Homer says "No one's ever been killed by a t-shirt cannon", a t-shirt is fired into the Flanders's house, breaking the picture of Maude Flanders. Ned looks directly at the audience after the picture breaks, a reference to his wife Maude being killed by a t-shirt cannon in "Alone Again, Natura-Diddily".

 Barney's statements of "First they came" invokes the poem of the same name by Pastor Martin Niemöller.

 When the president of Duff Beer says, "With great taste comes great responsibility", it is a reference to both the "drink responsibly" disclaimer in most beer advertisements and the famous "with great power there must also come great responsibility" line spoken by Ben Parker, uncle of Peter Parker/Spider-Man.

 The song that plays during several of the scenes is P!nk's "Get the Party Started".

 The end credits include a clip of Sam Simon describing his work, with a thank-you to him. Simon had died the week before on March 8, 2015.

 The intro advert for Homer as Duffman is a parody of the hit fantasy HBO show Game of Thrones and later Homer does a oath that parodies the Night Watches oath.

 The Knights of "Another Round-Table" is a parody of Knights of the Round Table.

 When Howard K. Duff VIII is welcoming Homer to his company, he shows him a painting of his ancestor Ichabod Duff crossing the Duffaware River. This is a reference to George Washington's crossing of the Delaware River.

Reception
The episode received a 1.5 rating and was watched by a total of 3.59 million people, making it the most watched show on Fox that night.

Dennis Perkins of The A.V. Club gave the episode a C rating, saying "There are a few funny lines scattered throughout ’Waiting For Duffman’ which provide exactly the quantity of laughs necessary to mark this as a serviceable Simpsons episode, without doing anything to rise above that standard."

References

External links 
 

2015 American television episodes
The Simpsons (season 26) episodes